Van Riper State Park is a public recreation area located in the Upper Peninsula of the U.S. state of Michigan,  west of Ishpeming on US Highway 41. The state park's  lie partly in Michigamme Township and partly in Champion Township, both in Marquette County.

History
This park is named after Dr. Paul Van Riper, who practiced medicine in the area for most of his 91 years, and was involved in the local politics of the region. He was also the father of pioneering speech-language pathologist and author Charles Van Riper. While serving on the Marquette County Board, he persuaded the Cleveland Cliffs Iron Company to turn the property over to the local township for use as a public park. A beach pavilion and changing house were built by the county in 1924. In 1956, the property was turned over to the state to become a state park.

Activities and amenities
The state park offers a water park. swimming, picnicking, fishing, campground and cabins, and five miles of hiking trails.

References

External links 
Van Riper State Park Michigan Department of Natural Resources
Van Riper State Park Map Michigan Department of Natural Resources

Protected areas of Marquette County, Michigan
State parks of Michigan
Protected areas established in 1956
1956 establishments in Michigan
IUCN Category III